The William Lawrence House is a historic house at 101 Somerset Avenue in Taunton, Massachusetts. It was built in 1860 by local carpenter Abel Burt for William Lawrence, a salesman.  It is a two-story roughly square wood-frame structure, with a mansard roof topped by a cupola.  The main entrance is set in a round-arch opening with a transom window, and its front porch features chamfered posts.  The house contains a unique mix of Italianate elements, such as its square plan, large cupola and bracketed eaves, combined with Second Empire elements such as its unusual Mansard roof with ogee curve sides and pronounced dormers.

The house was added to the National Register of Historic Places in 1985.

See also
National Register of Historic Places listings in Taunton, Massachusetts

References

National Register of Historic Places in Taunton, Massachusetts
Houses completed in 1860
Houses in Taunton, Massachusetts
Houses on the National Register of Historic Places in Bristol County, Massachusetts